Weser-Rhine Germanic is a proposed group of prehistoric West Germanic dialects which would have been both directly ancestral to Dutch, as well as being a notable substratum influencing West Central German dialects. The term was introduced by the German linguist Friedrich Maurer as a replacement for the older term Istvaeonic, with which it is essentially synonymous. The term Rhine-Weser-Germanic is sometimes preferred.

Nomenclature  
The term Istvaeonic is derived from the Istvæones (or Istvaeones), a culturo-linguistic grouping of Germanic tribes, mentioned by Tacitus in his Germania. Pliny the Elder further specified its meaning by claiming that the Istævones lived near the Rhine. Maurer used Pliny to refer to the dialects spoken by the Franks and Chatti around the northwestern banks of the Rhine, which were presumed to be descendants of the earlier Istvaeones. The Weser is a river in Germany, east of and parallel to the Rhine. The terms Rhine-Weser or Weser-Rhine, therefore, both describe the area between the two rivers as a meaningful cultural-linguistic region.

Theory 

Maurer asserted that the cladistic tree model, ubiquitously used in 19th and early 20th century linguistics, was too inaccurate to describe the relation between the modern Germanic languages, especially those belonging to its Western branch. Rather than depicting Old English, Old Dutch, Old Saxon, Old Frisian and Old High German to have simply 'branched off' a single common 'Proto-West Germanic', he proposed that there had been much more distance between the languages and the dialects of the Germanic regions.

Weser-Rhine Germanic seems to have been transitional between Elbe Germanic and North Sea Germanic, with a few innovations of their own.

References

Bibliography 
 Tacitus, Germania (1st Century AD). (in Latin)

See also
North Sea Germanic 
Elbe Germanic

Pre-Roman Iron Age
Germanic languages
West Germanic languages
Frankish people
Istvaeones